Tülay Özer (born 10 December 1946 in Kemaliye) is a Turkish singer, best known for her albums Tülay (1976), Seven Ağlatılmaz (1978), Kalbimdeki Sevgili (1981), Özleyiş (1989), and Olmalı Olacak (1993).

References 

1946 births
Living people
Turkish singers
People from Kemaliye